NGC 266 is a massive barred spiral galaxy in the constellation Pisces. It was discovered on September 12, 1784, by William Herschel. The form of this barred galaxy is described by its morphological classification of SB(rs)ab, which indicates a quasi-ring-like structure (rs) and moderate-to-tightly wound spiral arms (ab). It is the dominant member of a small group with six low-mass galaxies.

NGC 266 is an LINER-type active galaxy. It has a moderate star formation rate estimated at ·yr−1. A diffuse X-ray emission from hot gas has been detected around this galaxy, extending out to a radius of at least 70,000 light years. This emission not being driven by winds from a starburst region, so the root cause is unknown.

On October 12, 2005, a magnitude 16.8 supernova was discovered in NGC 266. An image of the galaxy taken on September 10 showed no supernova event, so this explosion occurred after that date. This event was designated SN 2005gl, and the progenitor was identified as a massive hypergiant star that was most likely a luminous blue variable.

References

External links
 

0266
LINER galaxies
Pisces (constellation)
Barred spiral galaxies
002901